The 1944 United States presidential election in Connecticut took place on November 7, 1944, as part of the 1944 United States presidential election. State voters chose eight electors to the Electoral College, which selected the president and vice president.

Incumbent Democratic President Franklin D. Roosevelt won the state over New York governor Thomas E. Dewey by a margin of 5.36%.

Results

By county

See also
 United States presidential elections in Connecticut

References

1944
Connecticut
1944 Connecticut elections